The 1959–60 AHL season was the 24th season of the American Hockey League. Seven teams played 72 games each in the schedule. The Quebec Aces become the first Canada-based team in the league. The Springfield Indians finished first overall in the regular season, and won their first Calder Cup championship.

Team changes
 The Quebec Aces, based in Quebec City, transfer to the AHL as an expansion team, from the defunct Quebec Hockey League.

Final standings
Note: GP = Games played; W = Wins; L = Losses; T = Ties; GF = Goals for; GA = Goals against; Pts = Points;

Scoring leaders

Note: GP = Games played; G = Goals; A = Assists; Pts = Points; PIM = Penalty minutes

 complete list

Calder Cup playoffs
First round
Springfield Indians defeated Providence Reds 4 games to 1.
Rochester Americans defeated Cleveland Barons 4 games to 3.
Finals
Springfield Indians defeated Rochester Americans 4 games to 1, to win the Calder Cup. 
 list of scores

All Star Classic
The 7th AHL All-Star Game was played on December 10, 1959, at the Eastern States Coliseum, in West Springfield, Massachusetts. The Springfield Indians defeated the AHL All-Stars by an 8-3 score.

Trophy and award winners
Team awards

Individual awards

See also
List of AHL seasons

References
AHL official site
AHL Hall of Fame
HockeyDB

American Hockey League seasons
2
2